Satori in Paris is a 1966 novella by American novelist and poet Jack Kerouac. It is a short, autobiographical tale of Kerouac's trip to Paris, then Brittany, to research his genealogy. Kerouac relates his trip in a tumbledown fashion as a lonesome traveler. Little is said about the research that he does, and much more about his interactions with the French people he meets.

Editions

1966. Satori in Paris, 
1982. Satori in Paris, Granada Publishing, 
1988. Satori in Paris & Pic, 
1991. Satori in Paris, Flamingo,

References 

1966 American novels
Novels by Jack Kerouac
Novels set in Paris
Novels set in Brittany
American novellas
Grove Press books